Whenever We Wanted is American singer-songwriter and musician John Mellencamp's 11th album, and the first to be credited simply to Mellencamp's given name (i.e., without the "Cougar" name).

The album reached the top 20 and went platinum. It includes the hits "Get A Leg Up" (#1 for three weeks on the Album Rock Tracks chart), "Now More Than Ever" (#3 on the Album Rock Tracks chart), "Last Chance" (#12 on the Album Rock Tracks chart), and "Again Tonight" (#1 for two weeks on the Album Rock Tracks chart). "Get A Leg Up" (#14) and "Again Tonight" (#36) also cracked the Billboard Hot 100.

Entertainment Weekly gave the album a positive review, stating: "To Mellencamp's credit, even though 'Whenever We Wanted' delivers his signature rock & roll punch, he doesn't try to. That Mellencamp still has the courage to make depressing assessments in a pop context is a victory that outweighs the record's other shortcomings."

Mellencamp later said the album was an attempt to "write American Fool with better lyrics" after a fan mentioned the previous two albums "had nothing about sex on them." This inspired him to write less about problems in the heartland and "get back to the basics."

Album notes
The woman featured on the cover with Mellencamp is Elaine Irwin. The cover photo was taken during the shoot for the video for the hit single "Get a Leg Up." The video was shot in July 1991; Mellencamp and Irwin did not see each other again until January 1992 when the Whenever We Wanted Tour pulled into New York City. They become a couple a short time later and were married in September 1992. They separated in September 2010 and were divorced in 2011.

After his previous two albums, The Lonesome Jubilee and Big Daddy, featured such non-traditional rock instruments as the accordion and violin, Mellencamp said that on Whenever We Wanted he wanted to put those instruments "back in their cases" and return to a harder-edged sound. Mellencamp further elaborated on the album, saying: "It's very rock 'n' roll. I just wanted to get back to the basics."

Track listing
All songs written by John Mellencamp, except where noted.
 "Love and Happiness" – 3:53
 "Now More Than Ever" – 3:43
 "I Ain't Ever Satisfied" – 3:36
 "Get a Leg Up" – 3:47
 "Crazy Ones" (Mellencamp, Randy Handley) – 4:01
 "Last Chance" – 3:39
 "They're So Tough" – 4:17
 "Melting Pot" – 4:47
 "Whenever We Wanted" – 3:42
 "Again Tonight" – 3:17
 "Love and Happiness (London Club Mix)" (2005 re-issue bonus track) – 6:33

Personnel
 John Mellencamp – vocals, guitar, hand percussion
 Kenny Aronoff – drums, percussion, vibes
 Mike Wanchic – guitar, background vocals
 Toby Myers – bass guitar, background vocals
 David Grissom – guitars
 John Cascella – Hammond B-3, accordion, penny whistle, Farfisa Organ
 Pharez Whitted – trumpet on "Love And Happiness" and "Whenever We Wanted"
Jay Healy – engineer, mixing

Charts

Certifications

References

John Mellencamp albums
1991 albums
Mercury Records albums